Miller Mill Run is a stream in the U.S. state of West Virginia.

Miller Mill Run most likely derives its name from John Miller, a pioneer settler.

See also
List of rivers of West Virginia

References

Rivers of Webster County, West Virginia
Rivers of West Virginia